Marcus "Mackan" Feldt (born 17 September 1970, in Uppsala) is a Swedish curler.

He participated at the 1998 Winter Olympic games where Swedish men's team finished in sixth place.

Teams

References

External links
 
 Marcus Feldt - SSE Executive Education

Living people
1970 births
Sportspeople from Uppsala
Swedish male curlers
World curling champions

Curlers at the 1998 Winter Olympics
Olympic curlers of Sweden